Geranomyia is a genus of crane fly in the family Limoniidae.

Species
G. ablusa (Alexander, 1967)
G. advena (Alexander, 1954)
G. aequabilis aequabilis Alexander, 1923
G. aequabilis deplexa (Alexander, 1941)
G. aeruginosa (Alexander, 1972)
G. alberticola (Alexander, 1956)
G. albilabris (Edwards, 1931)
G. alpestris (Alexander, 1930)
G. amblytylos (Alexander, 1964)
G. amoenalis (Alexander, 1945)
G. anduzeana (Alexander, 1943)
G. aneura (Alexander, 1971)
G. anisacantha (Alexander, 1964)
G. annandalei Edwards, 1913
G. annulosa (Alexander, 1929)
G. anthina (Alexander, 1945)
G. antillarum (Alexander, 1930)
G. apicifasciata (Alexander, 1930)
G. arecuna (Alexander, 1931)
G. argentacea (Alexander, 1980)
G. argentifera de Meijere, 1911
G. argentinensis Alexander, 1920
G. assueta (Alexander, 1943)
G. atlantica (Wollaston, 1858)
G. atrostriata Edwards, 1921
G. atychia (Alexander, 1964)
G. austroandina (Alexander, 1929)
G. austropicta (Alexander, 1929)
G. avara (Alexander, 1944)
G. avocetta Alexander, 1913
G. bahiensis (Alexander, 1930)
G. baliana (Alexander, 1934)
G. bancrofti Alexander, 1922
G. banksiana (Alexander, 1939)
G. beatrix (Alexander, 1945)
G. bezzii Alexander & Leonard, 1912
G. biargentata (Alexander, 1930)
G. bicincta Alexander, 1921
G. bifidaria (Alexander, 1931)
G. bifurcula (Alexander, 1933)
G. bivittata Becker, 1908
G. bogongicola (Alexander, 1930)
G. boki (Alexander, 1975)
G. brasiliensis (Westwood, 1836)
G. brevibasis (Alexander, 1972)
G. brevispinula (Alexander, 1930)
G. brunnescens de Meijere, 1916
G. bustilloi (Alexander, 1938)
G. callinota (Alexander, 1941)
G. caloptera Mik, 1867
G. canadensis (Westwood, 1836)
G. canariensis Bergroth, 1889
G. caribica (Alexander, 1970)
G. carunculata (Alexander, 1941)
G. cerberus Alexander, 1927
G. cernua (Alexander, 1942)
G. certhia Alexander, 1916
G. cinereinota Alexander, 1913
G. circipunctata Brunetti, 1912
G. cocoensis (Alexander, 1978)
G. commogastra (Alexander, 1967)
G. communis Osten Sacken, 1860
G. conjurata (Alexander, 1937)
G. conjuratoides (Alexander, 1945)
G. conquisita (Alexander, 1941)
G. contorta (Alexander, 1941)
G. contrita (Alexander, 1937)
G. cornigera Alexander, 1913
G. costaricensis Alexander, 1916
G. costomaculata Dietz, 1921
G. costosetosa (Alexander, 1956)
G. cubana (Alexander, 1930)
G. damicoi (Alexander, 1942)
G. deccanica (Alexander, 1968)
G. deleta (Alexander, 1937)
G. deliciosa (Alexander, 1934)
G. destricta (Alexander, 1940)
G. devota (Alexander, 1929)
G. diabolica (Alexander, 1944)
G. diargyria (Alexander, 1941)
G. dicranostyla (Alexander, 1964)
G. dischidia (Alexander, 1958)
G. discors (Alexander, 1980)
G. disparilis (Alexander, 1946)
G. distincta Doane, 1900
G. diversa Osten Sacken, 1860
G. dominicana (Alexander, 1939)
G. durga (Alexander, 1967)
G. dybasi (Alexander, 1972)
G. edwardsella (Alexander, 1967)
G. edwardsiana (Alexander & Alexander, 1973)
G. enderleini Alexander, 1913
G. entmema (Alexander, 1978)
G. erasmi (Alexander, 1933)
G. eremnopoda (Alexander, 1975)
G. errana (Alexander, 1930)
G. eurygramma Alexander, 1928
G. euryphallus (Alexander, 1960)
G. feuerborni (Alexander, 1931)
G. fimbriacosta (Alexander, 1961)
G. fimbriarum (Alexander, 1949)
G. flavicosta Brunetti, 1912
G. flavitarsis Edwards, 1928
G. flaviventris Brunetti, 1918
G. fletcheri Edwards, 1911
G. fluxa (Alexander, 1941)
G. forsteriana (Alexander, 1962)
G. fortibasis (Alexander, 1942)
G. fremida (Alexander, 1937)
G. fumimarginata (Alexander, 1936)
G. furor (Alexander, 1944)
G. fuscana (Macquart, 1838)
G. ganesa (Alexander, 1960)
G. gaudens Alexander, 1922
G. genitaloides Senior-White, 1924
G. gifuensis Alexander, 1921
G. glauca Alexander, 1916
G. gracilipalpis (Alexander, 1956)
G. gracilispinosa (Alexander, 1937)
G. grampianicola (Alexander, 1930)
G. gravelyana (Alexander, 1942)
G. griseipeltata (Alexander, 1956)
G. grus (Alexander, 1933)
G. guatemalensis Alexander, 1916
G. guianensis (Alexander, 1930)
G. hakoneana (Alexander, 1955)
G. hardyi Alexander, 1928
G. hedosyne (Alexander, 1961)
G. heteroxipha (Alexander, 1942)
G. hirsutinota (Alexander, 1943)
G. hirudinis (Alexander, 1967)
G. ibis Alexander, 1916
G. idiopygialis (Alexander, 1980)
G. immerita (Alexander, 1930)
G. immobilis (Alexander, 1932)
G. inaequispinosa (Alexander, 1940)
G. inaequituberculata (Alexander, 1930)
G. infamosa (Alexander, 1937)
G. innoxia (Alexander, 1968)
G. inornata Lackschewitz, 1928
G. inquisita (Alexander, 1942)
G. insignis (Loew, 1851)
G. intermedia (Walker, 1848)
G. irrorata Séguy, 1938
G. javanica Alexander, 1915
G. kiangsiana (Alexander, 1937)
G. knabiana Alexander, 1916
G. lachrymalis Alexander, 1916
G. lacteitarsis Alexander, 1922
G. lampronota (Edwards, 1932)
G. latitudinis (Alexander, 1954)
G. laudanda (Alexander, 1938)
G. lemniscata (Alexander, 1930)
G. lichyi (Alexander, 1943)
G. linearis Alexander, 1915
G. lineata Enderlein, 1912
G. longicrinita (Alexander, 1973)
G. longifimbriata (Alexander, 1931)
G. luteimana (Alexander, 1938)
G. luteinota (Alexander, 1956)
G. lutulenta Skuse, 1890
G. lycaon (Alexander, 1953)
G. macrauchenia (Alexander, 1957)
G. macrops Alexander, 1919
G. macta (Alexander, 1945)
G. malabarensis (Alexander, 1952)
G. manca Alexander, 1924
G. marthae (Alexander, 1930)
G. mashonica Alexander, 1920
G. melanocephala Edwards, 1926
G. melanomera (Alexander, 1980)
G. melanoxyna (Alexander, 1975)
G. memnonia (Alexander, 1961)
G. meracula (Alexander, 1936)
G. mexicana (Bellardi, 1861)
G. microphaea (Alexander, 1939)
G. militaris (Alexander, 1953)
G. monorhaphidia (Alexander, 1971)
G. montana de Meijere, 1911
G. multicolor (Alexander, 1966)
G. multipuncta Alexander, 1922
G. myersiana (Alexander, 1930)
G. neanthina (Alexander, 1955)
G. neavocetta (Alexander, 1938)
G. neogaudens (Alexander, 1942)
G. neonumenius (Alexander, 1930)
G. neoparilis (Alexander, 1962)
G. neopentheres (Alexander, 1930)
G. neopicta (Alexander, 1978)
G. neptis (Alexander, 1970)
G. nigripleura Alexander, 1919
G. nigronitida Alexander, 1921
G. nigronotata Brunetti, 1918
G. nigropaxilla (Alexander, 1974)
G. nigropeltata (Alexander, 1956)
G. nitida de Meijere, 1911
G. notatipennis Brunetti, 1913
G. nugatoria (Alexander, 1943)
G. numenius Alexander, 1913
G. obesistyla (Alexander, 1940)
G. obscura Strobl, 1900
G. obsolescens (Alexander, 1956)
G. offirmata (Alexander, 1936)
G. oneris (Alexander, 1957)
G. opinator (Alexander, 1950)
G. opulens (Alexander, 1946)
G. ornatrix Alexander, 1926
G. orthorhabda (Alexander, 1940)
G. palauensis (Alexander, 1972)
G. pallidapex (Alexander, 1946)
G. paramanca (Alexander, 1931)
G. parapentheres (Alexander, 1948)
G. parilis (Alexander, 1946)
G. pastazina (Alexander, 1944)
G. pentheres Alexander, 1928
G. penthoptera Alexander, 1924
G. perfecta Alexander, 1928
G. pergracilis (Alexander, 1980)
G. phoenaspis (Alexander, 1930)
G. phoenosoma (Alexander, 1931)
G. pictorum (Alexander, 1929)
G. picturella (Alexander, 1978)
G. platensis Alexander, 1923
G. pleuropalloris (Alexander, 1931)
G. plumbeicolor (Alexander, 1938)
G. plumbeipleura Alexander, 1916
G. podomelania (Alexander, 1981)
G. poliophara Alexander, 1927
G. procax (Alexander, 1960)
G. productella (Alexander, 1975)
G. propera (Alexander, 1949)
G. provocator (Alexander, 1941)
G. quinquelineata (Alexander, 1980)
G. rabula (Alexander, 1940)
G. radialis (Alexander, 1930)
G. recisa Alexander, 1927
G. recondita Alexander, 1921
G. refuga (Alexander, 1944)
G. relata (Alexander, 1944)
G. risibilis Alexander, 1928
G. rostrata (Say, 1823)
G. rubiginosa (Alexander, 1931)
G. rubrithorax Alexander, 1921
G. rudebecki (Alexander, 1964)
G. rufescens (Loew, 1851)
G. sagittifer Alexander, 1921
G. sakaguchii Alexander, 1924
G. sakalava (Alexander, 1961)
G. samoana Edwards, 1928
G. satipoana (Alexander, 1945)
G. scolopax Alexander, 1913
G. semifasciata Brunetti, 1911
G. semistriata Brunetti, 1911
G. separata Alexander, 1921
G. septemnotata Edwards, 1916
G. serotina Alexander, 1923
G. sexocellata Alexander, 1921
G. skuseana (Alexander, 1929)
G. snyderi (Alexander, 1972)
G. sorbillans (Wiedemann, 1828)
G. spangleri (Alexander, 1970)
G. sparsiguttata (Alexander, 1937)
G. spectata (Alexander, 1937)
G. stenoleuca (Alexander, 1957)
G. stenophallus (Alexander, 1944)
G. stoica (Alexander, 1941)
G. stylobtusa (Alexander, 1967)
G. subgaudens (Alexander, 1941)
G. subimmaculata Alexander, 1921
G. subinsignis Alexander, 1916
G. subparilis (Alexander, 1962)
G. subpentheres (Alexander, 1943)
G. subradialis (Alexander, 1937)
G. subrecisa (Alexander, 1933)
G. subserotina Alexander, 1921
G. subvirescens (Alexander, 1930)
G. suensoniana (Alexander, 1929)
G. sumptuosa (Alexander, 1942)
G. syamantaka (Alexander, 1963)
G. sylvania (Alexander, 1939)
G. synaporosa Speiser, 1913
G. taleola (Alexander, 1974)
G. tanytrichiata (Alexander, 1961)
G. tatei (Alexander, 1931)
G. tenebricosa Alexander, 1928
G. tenuispinosa (Alexander, 1929)
G. terpsis (Alexander, 1980)
G. tibialis (Loew, 1851)
G. timens (Alexander, 1950)
G. tonnoiri Alexander, 1928
G. torta (Alexander, 1938)
G. townsendi Alexander, 1916
G. toxeres (Alexander, 1974)
G. transitoria (Alexander, 1941)
G. trichomera (Alexander, 1939)
G. tridens Brunetti, 1912
G. tristella (Alexander, 1929)
G. tugela (Alexander, 1964)
G. tulumayoensis (Alexander, 1944)
G. tumidibasis (Alexander, 1938)
G. turbida Alexander, 1928
G. uberis (Alexander, 1939)
G. umbricolor (Alexander, 1937)
G. unicolor Haliday, 1833
G. unifilosa (Alexander, 1934)
G. unispinifera (Alexander, 1938)
G. valida (Loew, 1851)
G. valverdensis (Alexander, 1946)
G. vanduzeei Alexander, 1916
G. vanikorensis (Alexander, 1934)
G. variegata (Walker, 1837)
G. versuta (Alexander, 1930)
G. victoriae Alexander, 1928
G. villaricensis (Alexander, 1930)
G. vinaceobrunnea Brunetti, 1911
G. vindicta (Alexander, 1943)
G. virescens (Loew, 1851)
G. viridella (Alexander, 1930)
G. viriditincta (Alexander, 1980)
G. vitiella (Alexander, 1956)
G. walkeri (Alexander, 1930)
G. wigginsi (Alexander, 1978)
G. xanthoplaca Alexander, 1921
G. yunquensis (Alexander, 1957)
G. zionana (Alexander, 1948)

References

Limoniidae
Nematocera genera